Blattisocius tarsalis is a species of mites in the family Blattisociidae. It was described by Berlese in 1918.

References

Mesostigmata